The 1997–98 Sydney Storm season was the 6th season for the team, but first season known as the Storm. As was the case for the Franchises previous seasons they competed in the Australian Baseball League (ABL).

Offseason 
During the offseason the franchise changed its name from the Sydney Blues to the Sydney Storm, This was done as a result of legal action taken by Cricket NSW, Who also used the name Blues for its teams.

Regular season

Standings

Record vs opponents

Game log 

|- bgcolor=#bbffbb
| 1
| 1 November (DH 1)
| 
| 11–10
| 
| 
| 
| 
| 1-0
|
|- bgcolor=#bbffbb
| 2
| 1 November (DH 2)
| 
| 5–3
| 
| 
| 
| 
| 2-0
|
|- bgcolor=#bbbbbb
| 3
| 2 November (DH 1)
| 
| Re-Scheduled
| 
| 
| 
| 
| 2-0
|
|- bgcolor=#bbbbbb
| 4
| 2 November (DH 2)
| 
| Re-Scheduled
| 
| 
| 
| 
| 2-0
|
|- bgcolor=#bbffbb
| 5
| 7 November (DH 1)
| @ 
| 5–3
| 
| 
| 
| 
| 3-0
| 
|- bgcolor=#ffbbbb
| 6
| 7 November (DH 2)
| @ 
| 2-3
| 
| 
| 
| 
| 3-1
| 
|- bgcolor=#ffbbbb
| 7
| 8 November (DH 1)
| @ 
| 3-10
| 
| 
| 
| 
| 3-2
| 
|- bgcolor=#ffbbbb
| 8
| 8 November (DH 2)
| @ 
| 1-4
| 
| 
| 
| 
| 3-3
| 
|- bgcolor=#bbffbb
| 9
| 15 November (DH 1)
|
| 5-1
| 
| 
| 
| 
| 4-3
| 
|- bgcolor=#bbffbb
| 10
| 15 November (DH 2)
| 
| 9-5
| 
| 
| 
| 
| 5-3
| 
|- bgcolor=#ffbbbb
| 11
| 16 November (DH 1)
| 
| 3-4
| 
| 
| 
| 
| 5-4
| 
|- bgcolor=#ffbbbb
| 12
| 16 November (DH 2)
| 
| 7-11
| 
| 
| 
| 
| 5-5
| 
|- bgcolor=#ffbbbb
| 13
| 
| @ 
| 1–5
| 
| 
| 
| 
| 5-6
|
|- bgcolor=#bbffbb
| 14
| 
| @ 
| 3–2
| 
| 
| 
| 
| 6-6
|
|- bgcolor=#bbffbb
| 15
| 
| @ 
| 5–2
| 
| 
| 
| 
| 7-6
|
|- bgcolor=#bbffbb
| 16
| 
| @ 
| 6–3
| 
| 
| 
| 
| 8-6
|
|- bgcolor=#bbffbb
| 17
| 
| 
| 6–5
| 
| 
| 
| 
| 9-6
|
|- bgcolor=#ffbbbb
| 18
| 
| 
| 1–4
| 
| 
| 
| 
| 9-7
|
|- bgcolor=#bbffbb
| 19
| 
| 
| 8–7
| 
| 
| 
| 
| 10-7
|
|- bgcolor=#ffbbbb
| 20
| 
| 
| 2–6
| 
| 
| 
| 
| 10-8
|
|-
|-

|-
|- bgcolor=#bbffbb
| 21
| 5 December
| 
| 3-2
| 
| 
| 
| 
| 11-8
| 
|- bgcolor=#bbffbb
| 22
| 6 December (DH 1)
| 
| 6-5
| 
| 
| 
| 
| 12-8
| 
|- bgcolor=#ffbbbb
| 23
| 6 December (DH 2)
| 
| 4-8
| 
| 
| 
| 
| 12-9
| 
|- bgcolor=#bbffbb
| 24
| 7 December
| 
| 18-5
| 
| 
| 
| 
| 13-9
| 
|- bgcolor=#bbffbb
| 25
| 
| @ 
| 8–5
| 
| 
| 
| 
| 14-9
|
|- bgcolor=#bbffbb
| 26
| 
| @ 
| 4–1
| 
| 
| 
| 
| 15-9
|
|- bgcolor=#ffbbbb
| 27
| 
| @ 
| 4–6
| 
| 
| 
| 
| 15-10
|
|- bgcolor=#bbbbbb
| 28
| 
| @ 
| Wash Out
| 
| 
| 
| 
| 15-10
|
|- bgcolor=#bbffbb
| 29
| 19 December
| @ 
| 5-3
| 
| 
| 
| 
| 16-10
| 
|- bgcolor=#ffbbbb
| 30
| 20 December (DH 1)
| @ 
| 3-6
| 
| 
| 
| 
| 16-11
| 
|- bgcolor=#ffbbbb
| 31
| 20 December (DH 2)
| @ 
| 0-1
| 
| 
| 
| 
| 16-12
| 
|- bgcolor=#bbffbb
| 32
| 21 December
| @ 
| 6–5
| 
| 
| 
| 
| 17-12
| 
|- bgcolor=#bbffbb
| 33
|
| 
| 23–9
| 
| 
| 
| 
| 18-12
| 
|- bgcolor=#bbffbb
| 34
|
| 
| 3–2
| 
| 
| 
| 
| 19-12
|
|- bgcolor=#bbffbb
| 35
|
| 
| 10–0
| 
| 
| 
| 
| 20-12
|
|- bgcolor=#bbffbb
| 36
|
| 
| 10–7
| 
| 
| 
| 
| 21-12
|
|-
|-

|- bgcolor=#bbffbb
| 37
| 3 January
| @ 
| 4-1
| 
| 
| 
| 
| 22-12
| 
|- bgcolor=#ffbbbb
| 38
| 4 January
| @ 
| 1-10
| 
| 
| 
| 
| 22-13
| 
|- bgcolor=#bbffbb
| 39
| 5 January
| @ 
| 8-4
| 
| 
| 
| 
| 23-13
| 
|- bgcolor=#bbffbb
| 3
| 
|  
| 17-14
| 
| 
| 
| 
| 24-13
| 
|- bgcolor=#bbffbb
| 40
| 9 January
| 
| 10-3
| 
| 
| 
| 
| 25-13
| 
|- bgcolor=#bbffbb
| 41
| 10 January
| 
| 14-3
| 
| 
| 
| 
| 26-13
| 
|- bgcolor=#bbffbb
| 42
| 11 January
| 
| 10-3
| 
| 
| 
| 
| 27-13
| 
|- bgcolor=#ffbbbb
| 43
| 16 January
| @ 
| 12-17
| 
| 
| 
| 
| 27-14
| 
|- bgcolor=#ffbbbb
| 44
| 17 January (DH 2)
| @ 
| 2-7
| 
| 
| 
| 
| 27-15
| 
|- bgcolor=#ffbbbb
| 45
| 17 January (DH 2)
| @ 
| 7-15
| 
| 
| 
| 
| 27-16
| 
|- bgcolor=#ffbbbb
| 46
| 18 January
| @ 
| 8-10
| 
| 
| 
| 
| 27-17
| 
|- bgcolor=#bbffbb
| 47
| 
| @ 
| 3-2
| 
| 
| 
| 
| 28-17
| 
|- bgcolor=#ffbbbb
| 48
| 
| @ 
| 1-6
| 
| 
| 
| 
| 28-18
| 
|- bgcolor=#ffbbbb
| 49
| 
| @ 
| 1-2
| 
| 
| 
| 
| 28-19
| 
|- bgcolor=#ffbbbb
| 50
| 
| 
| 3-9
| 
| 
| 
| 
| 28-20
|
|- bgcolor=#ffbbbb
| 51
| 
| 
| 5-8
| 
| 
| 
| 
| 28-21
|
|- bgcolor=#bbffbb
| 52
| 
| 
| 12-7
| 
| 
| 
| 
| 29-21
|
|- bgcolor=#bbffbb
| 53
| 31 January
| 
| 14–11
| 
| 
| 
| 
| 30-21
| 
|-

|- bgcolor=#ffbbbb
| 54
| 1 February
| 
| 4–13
| 
| 
| 
| 
| 30-22
| 
|- bgcolor=#bbffbb
| 55
| 2 February
| 
| 10-9
| 
| 
| 
| 
| 31-22
| 
|- bgcolor=#bbffbb
| 4
| 
| 
| 11-5
| 
| 
| 
| 
| 32-22
| 
|-

Postseason

Finals Series at Melbourne Ballpark
In previous years the post season was played as home and away best of 3 games, with the two winner of each series meeting for a best of 5 series{fact}, in 1997-98 this was changed to a round robin play-off format with each team playing 3 games, 1 against each of the other 3 qualified teams, with the two highest places teams playing off in the Championship Series.

All games for the 9th ABL title were played at the Melbourne Ballpark from February, 10-12 with the best of three championship series February 14–15.

Finals Series (Storm games)
Full series results

Game 2: 10 February 1998

Game 3: 11 February 1998

Game 5: 12 February 1998

Postseason Ladder

ABL awards

All-stars

Storm Awards

Roster

References 

Sydney Storm